Bandar Band is an Iranian drama film, directed by Manijeh Hekmat and released in 2020. The film centres on a trio of musicians who have entered a music competition in Tehran, but whose travel plans are complicated and upended by the 2019 Iran floods.

The film premiered at the 2020 Toronto International Film Festival.

References

External links

2020 films
2020 drama films
Iranian drama films
Films shot in Iran
Films set in Iran
Films directed by Manijeh Hekmat